Frederick Schmid, better known by his stage name Freddy Fresh, is an American DJ, musician, and electronic music producer. Fresh has recorded for over 100 independent record labels, including major labels Sony UK, Virgin, BMG UK, and Harthouse Germany. He is also founder of the record labels Howlin' Records, Electric Music Foundation, and Analog.

Fresh had two international hit records in the UK, "Badder Badder Schwing" (featuring Fatboy Slim) and "What It Is". Fresh has performed in clubs, as well as festivals, including Glastonbury Festival, Creamfields Festival UK, Reading-Leeds Festival, and Jazz and Groove Festival.

Early life
Fresh was born Frederick Schmid, in Minneapolis, Minnesota, United States.

Career
In addition to a growing U.S. audience, Fresh was also one of the few contemporary non-Detroit musicians of the techno/electro genre to receive a strong European following. His records for Experimental, Harthouse and Martin "Biochip C" Damm's Anodyne label were evidence of his popularity in Europe and also strengthened his international presence. Although Fresh's releases included tracks in hip hop, house music, techno and trance music, his musical essence exists in the electro and breaks subgenres.

Although Fresh grew up listening to gothic rock and new wave, a trip to the Bronx, New York, U.S. in 1984 introduced him to the hip hop scene. Fresh began collecting DJ tapes (Shep Pettibone and Marley Marl) and records from the Jonzun Crew, Newcleus, Liquid Liquid, Cerrone, Shannon and Cat Stevens.

Fresh's first studio recording was released on Boogie Down Productions, with Fresh remixing a track for The Man & His Music Dedication album for Scott La Rock. Fresh then constructed his own studio, collecting numerous analog and modular synthesizers as part of the building process. In 1992, after releasing debut singles on Nu Groove and Experimental, Fresh's first record label, Analog Recordings, was formed in late 1992, and grew to include numerous imprints: Analog UK, Butterbeat, Electric Music Foundation, Socket and Boriqua.

The label and its offshoots have since attracted Thomas Heckman, Tim Taylor, Cari Lekebusch, DJ Slip, the Bassbin Twins, and Biochip C. In 1995, Fresh signed a contract with German techno label Harthouse Records and his second full-length album, Accidentally Classic, was released by the label's UK arm in late 1996 – a Harthouse U.S. reissue was later released.

His third album, The Last True Family Man, was released on the Eye Q label and resulted in two international chart hits, "Badder Badder Schwing" (featuring Fat Boy Slim) and "What It Is". The recordings peaked at number 34 and number 63, respectively, in the 1999 UK Singles Chart. Several singles and a mix album followed, until 2001's release, Music for Swingers. Fresh subsequently issued numerous albums on Howlin Records.

In the late 1990s, he formed the record label Against The Grain with then-partner Krafty Kuts. Fresh also released records through the Wisconsin, U.S.-based Drop Bass Network and the German label "Electrecord."

In 2000, Fresh also formed a collectors label specializing in vinyl 45 singles, called "Howlin' Records", and released over 35 singles and four albums through the label. The catalog of Howlin' Record includes "Have Records Will Travel," "Outstanding in His Field," "Diggin' Up Ghosts," "Surrounded By Funk" and Howlin' Greatest Hits.

In 2004, Fresh released the reference book entitled Freddy Fresh Presents The Rap Records, which covers the history of the early independent "old school" rap scene, and provides an extensive catalog of rap releases from 1979 to 1989. The book was featured in The Source, Vibe, The New York Times and Village Voice, and won journalism awards in the U.S. — it is recognized as the only reference book on the subject. Fresh released the updated second edition, with over 740 pages and more than 2,500 color photographs.

In 2008, Fresh released the updated Freddy Fresh Presents The Rap Records Book Revised Edition that contains thousands of full-color photos from the independent rap scene.

In 2014, Fresh taught DJ techniques at the McNally Smith College of Music in St. Paul, Minnesota. He began work on his next album, Play The Music, with a launch of various singles starting with the song "Hardcore Rocka" done with Andy Ictus feat. Jamaica reggae stars Tanto Metro & Devonte with a video released in October 2014.

Discography

Albums
Play The Music (CD, Album) HCD08 2015
Textura (20xFile, MP3, 320)	Howlin' Records HDG 04 2009			
Tangene (10xFile, MP3, Album) Howlin' Records HDG 03 2009			
Time Again (15xFile, MP3, 320) Howlin' Records HDG 01 2008			
Freddy Fresh Presents Rory Hoy - Cosmic Child (CD, Album)	Howlin' Records HCD06 2008			
Surrounded By Funk 2 versions Howlin' Records 2007			
Freddy Fresh Presents The Conductor Crucified - Its Sorta Like Sweeping in the Wind (CD, Album)	Stark Ravin' Records	SRCD01 2007			
Diggin' Up Ghosts (CD, Album)	Howlin' Records HCD03 2005			
Outstanding in His Field (CD, Album) Howlin' RecordsHowlin' CD 02 2004			
Have Record Will Travel 2 versions	Howlin' Records 2003			
Freddy Fresh & MPC Genius - The Trainspotters Dream Mastermix Vol. 3 (CD, Album, Mixed, Promo)	Delic Records	FFCD-003 2003			
Music For Swingers 2 versions Brooklyn Music Limited (BML) 2002			
Watch That Sound 2 versions	Millennium Records	2002			
Freddy Fresh & MPC Genius - The Trainspotters Dream Mix Vol. 1 (CD, Album, Mixed, Promo) Howlin' Records 2002			
Freddy Fresh & MPC Genius - The Trainspotters Dream Mastermix Vol. 1 (CD, Album, Mixed, Promo)	Delic Records	FFCD-002 2002			
The Last True Family Man 8 versions Eye Q (UK) 1998			
Accidentally Classic 3 versions Harthouse1996			
Freddy Fresh / Biochip C. - Los Amigos En Electro 2 versions	Anodyne (2)1996			
Analog Space Funk (CD, Album) Analog Records USA none 1996			
Freddie Fresh* Presents Nitrate - Acid Stuker (CD, Album) Death Becomes Me, Labworks UK DBMLABCD 9 1996

Singles and EPs
 Freddy Fresh, Kitten and The Hip HDG15 2014
Freddy Fresh, Andy Ictus, Tanto Metro & Devonte - Hardcore Rocka (File, AIFF, EP)	Howlin' Records HDG14 2014																																																									
Paul Birken And Freddy Fresh - Midwest Whippersnappers EP (12", EP)	Earwiggle EAR 003 2012																																																									
Freddy Fresh / Mick & Marc - Big M Productions Presents... Vol.1 (12", Promo)Big M Productions	BigMP01 2009																																																									
Tasty EP (12", EP, Ltd)	Howlin' Records, Howlin' Records	HOWLIN1201, Howlin' 01 / 12	2007																																																									
Flamenco (7")	Howlin' Records Howlin' 32 2004																																																									
For Alex (7")	Howlin' Records Howlin' 30 2004																																																									
Winter / Black Out (12")	Electric Music Foundation EMF 032003																																																									
They Can't Compete (7")	Howlin' Records Howlin' 262003																																																									*VTreacherous Three / Freddy Fresh - Bum Bum Bum Bum / He Lay Face Down(7")	Howlin' Records Howlin' 25 2003																																																									
Bowlin' With Mike (7")	Howlin' Records Howlin' 27 2003																																																									
Orange Krush (7", Ltd, Cle)	Electric Music Foundation EMF 02.5	2003																																																									
Boricua House Party 2 versions Peppermint Jam 2002																																																									
Sunshine / That Big Beat Feeling 2 versions	Howlin' Records 2002																																																									
Music For Swingers 2 versions Howlin' Records 2002																																																									
Feel The Groove EP 2 versions Electric Music Foundation 2002																																																									
Freddy Fresh / Spear 'N Jackson - Music for the Younger Set / Babysitting 2 versions	Howlin' Records		2001																																																									
 Abstract Funk Theory Sampler (12", Smplr) Obsessive	EVSLP17E1 2001																																																									
Krafty Kuts / Freddy Fresh - Stop The Nonsense / La Chunga (7")	Howlin' Records- Howlin' 03 2001																																																									
Dynamo Productions / Freddy Fresh w/ Skate Board Kings - A Message From The King / Are You Feelin' It (7")	Howlin' Records	Howlin' 11	2001																																																									
Abstract Funk Theory Sampler (12", Smplr) Obsessive EVSLP17S	2001																																																									
Still/ The Joint Sugarhill Remixed (Megamix) (12", S/Sided, TP)	Sanctuary Records	CLK12001	2000																																																									
Have Some Faith / Badder Badder Schwing (Unreleased Japanese Edit) (7", Promo)	Howlin' Records -Howlin' 02	2000																																																									
Freddy Hums Your Favourites (12")	Kingsize	KS 42 2000																																																									
Freddy Fresh Featuring Fatboy Slim - Badder Badder Schwing 6 versions Eye Q (UK) 1998																																																									
 What It Is 8 versions Eye Q (UK)	 1999																																																									
Freddy Fresh / Le Tone / First Born* / Space Raiders - Untitled (CD, Single, Comp)	Sony Music SINE 001CD 1999																																																									
Yew'r A Sissy (10", Promo) Fresh (UK)	FRESH 001 1999																																																									
Freddy Fresh & Beat Archaeo'logist, The / Silverkick - Mr Roachclip / Voyle(7", Num)	Slut Smalls SMALL 005 1999																																																									
It's About the Groove 5 versions	Eye Q (UK)	 1998																																																									
Tim Taylor & Freddy Fresh - Fear of Music 2 2 versions	Fear of Music	1998																																																									
Down for the Count 4 versions	Eye Q (UK)		1998																																																									
DJ Voodoo (2) & DJ Tree / Freddie Fresh* - A Voodoo Nation (12")	Swell Records	SWELL007	1998																																																									
Quiver 2 versions	Analog Records USA	1997																																																									
Barrio Grooves 3 versions	Harthouse	 1997																																																									
Chupacabbra 3 versions	Harthouse	1997																																																									
Flava 3 versions	Harthouse		1997																																																									
Drum Lesson 3 versions	Eye Q (UK)		1997																																																									
Freddie Fresh* Featuring Invisible Man, The* - Fresh Is The Word 2 versions	Sockett		1997																																																									
Yew'r A Sissy 2 2 versions	Fresh (UK)		1997																																																									
Analogue Space Funk EP 2 versions	Holzplatten		1997																																																									
Axodya Limited 007 (12")	Axodya	Axodya Limited 007	1997																																																									
Scared (12")	Pussy Lick	PL01	1997																																																									
Dan Zamani, DJ Slip, Freddie Fresh* & Tim Taylor - Minneapolis Sessions Part 2 (12")	Analog Records USA	Analog 33	1997																																																									
Freddie Fresh*, Tim Taylor, DJ Slip & Dan Zamani - The Minneapolis Sessions(2x12")	Missile Records	Missile 20	1997																																																									
Smells Like Funk 4 versions	Harthouse	 1996																																																									
D.J. Delite 2 versions	Electric Music Foundation	1995																																																									
Freddie Fresh* / Andre Estrada - Aurora EP 2 versions	Analog UK	1995																																																									
Freddie Fresh* / Brixton - Analog 23 2 versions	Analog Records USA	1996																																																									
'Lectro Outtakes 3 versions	Electrecord (2)	1996																																																									
Tension EP 2 versions	Emergency Broadcast, PIAS Holland	1996																																																									
Freddie Fresh* & Tim Taylor - Untitled 2 versions	Not on Label		1996																																																									
Federico Fresh* y Loco Puertoriqueno - Abusadora EP (12", EP)	Boriqua	BF01	1996																																																									
Paul Mix & Freddie Fresh* - Gates (12")	Analog UK	anauk03	1996																																																									
Freddie Fresh* / Auto Kinetic - Auto Kinetic vs. Freddie Fresh (12")	Electric Music Foundation	EF17-12	1996																																																									
Freddie Fresh* Presents Nitrate - The Fog (12")	Death Becomes Me, Labworks UK	DBMUNDLAB027	1996																																																									
Brixton vs. Freddie Fresh* - 505 Track (12", Whi)	X0X Track	TR 505	1996																																																									
Flotsom (12")	Harthouse	HHUK 005	1996																																																									
Logical Grooves (12")	Hybrid Sound Architectures	HYB 022	1996																																																									
Comatone 95 2 versions	Electric Music Foundation		1995																																																									
Freddie Fresh* / Mike Henk - Untitled 3 versions	Pulsar Recordings		1995																																																									
Freddie Fresh* vs. Dr. Walker - DJ Fresh Analog U.S. Vs. Walker Cologne DJ.Ungle Fever Germany 2 versions	Analog Records USA		1995																																																									
Freddie Fresh* & Woody McBride - Psychopocalyptic 95 3 versions	Analog Records USA		1995																																																									
Federico Fresh* / Biochip C. - Los Amigos En Acid 2 versions	Analog Records USA		1995																																																									
Freddie Fresh* & Tim Taylor - St Paul EP 2 versions	UXB		1995																																																									
House of Electronics 2 versions	Psycho Trax		1995																																																									
Freddie Fresh* & Tim Taylor - The Penguin / Scissorhands 2 versions	Missile Records		1995																																																									
DJ Hyperactive / Freddie Fresh* - Alien Funk (12")	Delirium USA	delerium usa 950603	1995																																																									
Brixton vs. Frederick Frisch* - Kein Anschluss (12")	Holzplatten	HOLZ005	1995																																																									
Thought Process 2 versions	Analog Records USA		1994																																																									
Equinox (5) / Freddie Fresh* - Pollux / The Searchers 2 versions	Synewave London		1994																																																									
From Minneapolis To Paris 2 versions	Radikal Groov Records		1994																																																									
Analogical Mind (12", Cle + 12", Cle)	Dj.ungle Fever	D.J.UNGLE FEVER 014	1994																																																									
Gnarl EP (12", EP)	Drop Bass Network	DBN014	1994																																																									
Freddie Fresh* / Paul Mix - Blinky & Hud E.P.  3 versions	Analog Records USA, Digidl 1993																																																									
Paul Mix & Freddie Fresh* - Compilation #001 2 versions	Analog Records USA, Digidl 1993																																																									
Advanced Waveform Synthetix 2 versions Experimental	1993																																																									
Freddie Fresh* / Auto Kinetic - TBor notTB / Diode (7", Cle)	Electric Music Foundation	EF 01-7 1993																																																									
Freddie Fresh* / Auto Kinetic - Tarantula / Pterodactyl (7", Ltd, Cle)	Electric Music Foundation, Electric Music Foundation	EF 03-7, EF03-7	1993																																																									
The Rave Mixes Volume 1 (12")	Rave Records (USA)	RM 912	1992																																																									
Hidden Rhythm (2) & Freddie Fresh* - B.O.O.M. (12")	Nu Groove Records NG-109 1992																																																									
Comatone EP (12", EP)	EXperimental	EX-09	1992																																																									
Feelin' Mighty Fresh 2 versions	Sensuist Records Unknown																																																									
909 Track (12") X0X Track TR 909	Unknown

Compilation albums
Abstract Funk Theory 3 versions Obsessive 2001

DJ mixes
The Rap Records - The Mastermix (3xCD, Mixed) Ful-Fill Recording FFR007	2010																																																									
The Essential Mix 3 versions Word Up Records 1998																																																									
Freddy Fresh Presents B-Boy Stance (Original Old Skool Party Rockers) 3 versions	Strut 2002																																																									
Still / The Joint (CD, Mixed) Sanctuary Records SANCD008	2000																																																									
DJ Freddie Fresh* / DJ Tim Taylor* - Transcore Version 4.0 (2xCD, Comp, Mixed) Fairway Record 50548	1995

Miscellaneous
Freddy Fresh & MPC Genius - The Trainspotters Dream Mastermix Vol. 2 2 versions	Delic Records 2002

Film and advertising

Fresh's music also appeared in films such as Austin Powers in Goldmember and Jackie Chan's The Tuxedo, as well as in television commercials by Adidas, Budweiser, Coors, Ritz Crackers, and Xbox.

Touring

Fresh tours regularly and has DJ'd in over 34 countries, including Russia (Olympic Stadium, where he opened for The Orb), Australia ("Teriyaki Anarki Saki" and Future Entertainment), Canada (MTV Canada) and Spain (Club Spain). He has also been featured on Club TV, S2 and House Viva TV. His list of radio appearances include two Peel sessions for John Peel on BBC Radio 1.

Fresh mixes all his tracks live. He sequences with an MPC 2000XL and MPC 4000, and uses pre-midi analog synthesizers and modular systems.

Personal life

Fresh married his wife, Alexandra, on 21 April 2005, in St. Paul, Minnesota, U.S. The couple are parents of two daughters.

References

External links
 – official site

Freddy Fresh at SoundCloud
They're rapping for a hip hop diploma article on CNN

Living people
American DJs
American electronic musicians
Record producers from Minnesota
Musicians from Minnesota
Year of birth missing (living people)